The 2022 ITF Féminin Le Neubourg was a professional tennis tournament played on outdoor hard courts. It was the second edition of the tournament which was part of the 2022 ITF Women's World Tennis Tour. It took place in Le Neubourg, France between 12 and 18 September 2022.

Champions

Singles

  Jaqueline Cristian def.  Magali Kempen, 6–4, 6–4

Doubles

  Freya Christie /  Ali Collins def.  Weronika Falkowska /  Sarah Beth Grey, 1–6, 7–6(7–4), [10–3]

Singles main draw entrants

Seeds

 1 Rankings are as of 29 August 2022.

Other entrants
The following players received wildcards into the singles main draw:
  Audrey Albié
  Manon Arcangioli
  Océane Babel
  Kristina Dmitruk

The following player received entry into the singles main draw using a protected ranking:
  Lu Jingjing

The following players received entry from the qualifying draw:
  Anna Brogan
  Freya Christie
  Nadiya Kolb
  Emma Léné
  Maileen Nuudi
  Marine Partaud
  Tamira Paszek
  Arlinda Rushiti

References

External links
 2022 ITF Féminin Le Neubourg at ITFtennis.com
 Official website

2022 ITF Women's World Tennis Tour
2022 in French tennis
September 2022 sports events in France